Under One Roof may refer to:

In television:
 Under One Roof (1985 TV series), an American teen sitcom previously titled Spencer
 Under One Roof (1993 TV series), a Japanese series generally known under the title Hitotsu Yane no Shita
 Under One Roof (Singapore TV series), a 1995–2003 Singaporean sitcom
 Under One Roof (1995 TV series), an American drama series
 Under One Roof (2002 TV series), an American reality series
 Under One Roof (2008 TV series), an American comedy series

In other media:
 Under One Roof (album), a 1998 album by Hunters and Collectors
 Under One Roof (film), a 2002 gay-themed romantic comedy-drama
 Under One Roof, a 1946 documentary short film directed by Lewis Gilbert
 Under One Roof, a 1917 novel by Mary Cholmondeley
 "Under One Roof", a 1976 song by The Rubettes